The 2022 Veneto Open Internazionali Confindustria Venezia e Rovigo was a professional tennis tournament played on outdoor grass courts. It was the first edition of the tournament and part of the 2022 WTA 125 tournaments, offering a total of $115,000 in prize money. It took place at Via Alcide de Gasperi in Gaiba, Italy between 13 and 19 June 2022. It became the first ever WTA 125 event to be played on grass courts.

Singles main-draw entrants

Seeds 

 1 Rankings are as of 6 June 2022.

Other entrants 
The following players received a wildcard into the singles main draw:
  Melania Delai
  Cristiana Ferrando
  Matilde Paoletti
  Lisa Pigato

The following players entered the main draw with protected ranking:
  Kateryna Baindl

Withdrawals 
Before the tournament
  Mihaela Buzărnescu → replaced by  Elisabetta Cocciaretto
  Misaki Doi → replaced by  Lucrezia Stefanini
  Ekaterine Gorgodze → replaced by  Joanne Züger
  Réka Luca Jani → replaced by  Linda Fruhvirtová
  Nadia Podoroska → replaced by  Susan Bandecchi
  Laura Pigossi → replaced by  Sara Errani
  Martina Trevisan → replaced by  Federica Di Sarra
  Yuan Yue → replaced by  Ysaline Bonaventure

Doubles entrants

Seeds 

 1 Rankings as of 6 June 2022.

Other entrants 
The following pair received a wildcard into the doubles main draw:
  Matilde Paoletti /  Lisa Pigato

Champions

Singles

  Alison Van Uytvanck def.  Sara Errani 6–4, 6–3

Doubles

  Madison Brengle /  Claire Liu def.  Vitalia Diatchenko /  Oksana Kalashnikova 6–4, 6–3

References

External links 
 Official website

2022 WTA 125 tournaments
Tennis tournaments in Italy
2022 in Italian tennis
June 2022 sports events in Italy